The School of Technology and Management of Oliveira do Hospital (Escola Superior de Tecnologia e Gestão de Oliveira do Hospital - ESTGOH) is a Higher Education School in Portugal, an organic unit of the Polytechnical Institute of Coimbra. Is located in Oliveira do Hospital, and offers courses in management and engineering.

Higher education in Portugal
Educational institutions with year of establishment missing
Buildings and structures in Coimbra District